Pollux may refer to:

People
Julius Pollux, also known as Ioulios Poludeukes (2nd century A.D), a Greek rhetorician
Pollux (mythology) or Polydeuces, one of the Dioscuri and twin brother of Castor

Astronomy
Pollux (star), (β Geminorum)
Pollux, a crater on the Saturnian moon Epimetheus

Games
Pollux, a character in the erotic anime series Words Worth
Pollux (arcade game), an arcade game manufactured by Dooyong in 1991
Pollux Gamelabs, a Danish game development company.
Pollux Engine, a game engine used in Final Fantasy Crystal Chronicles: Echoes of Time

Ships
, the name of more than one ship
, the name of more than one United States Navy ship
 was known as Pollux in 1994-1995

Other uses
Kastor und Pollux, a complex of two towers in Frankfurt am Main, Germany
Pollux, a South Devon Railway 4-4-0ST steam locomotive of the South Devon Railway Eagle class
Pollux (mountain), a mountain in the Pennine Alps, in Italy and Switzerland
Pollux Peak, a mountain in Yellowstone National Park, US 
Pollux Temple, a summit in the Grand Canyon, US
RTV-N-15 Pollux, an experimental pulsejet-powered research missile of the U.S. Navy